CGAP may refer to:
 Cancer Genome Anatomy Project, with the goal of documenting sequences of RNA transcripts
 Consultative Group to Assist the Poor, a partnership of organizations at the World Bank